Seychelles competed at the 2014 Summer Youth Olympics, in Nanjing, China from 16 August to 28 August 2014.

Badminton

Seychelles was given a quota to compete by the tripartite committee.

Singles

Doubles

Swimming

Seychelles qualified one swimmer.

Boys

Weightlifting

Seychelles was given a quota to compete in a girls' event by the tripartite committee.

Girls

References

2014 in Seychelles
Nations at the 2014 Summer Youth Olympics
Seychelles at the Youth Olympics